Daniel Giger (born 1 October 1949) is a Swiss fencer. He won a silver medal in the team épée event at the 1972 Summer Olympics and a bronze in the same event at the 1976 Summer Olympics.

References

1949 births
Living people
Swiss male fencers
Olympic fencers of Switzerland
Fencers at the 1972 Summer Olympics
Fencers at the 1976 Summer Olympics
Fencers at the 1984 Summer Olympics
Olympic silver medalists for Switzerland
Olympic bronze medalists for Switzerland
Olympic medalists in fencing
Medalists at the 1972 Summer Olympics
Medalists at the 1976 Summer Olympics
20th-century Swiss people